The Mayor of Livorno is an elected politician who, along with the Livorno's City Council, is accountable for the strategic government of Livorno in Tuscany, Italy. The current Mayor is Luca Salvetti, a centre-left independent, who took office on 11 June 2019.

Overview
According to the Italian Constitution, the Mayor of Livorno is member of the City Council.

The Mayor is elected by the population of Livorno, who also elect the members of the City Council, controlling the Mayor's policy guidelines and is able to enforce his resignation by a motion of no confidence. The Mayor is entitled to appoint and release the members of his government.

Since 1995 the Mayor is elected directly by Livorno's electorate: in all mayoral elections in Italy in cities with a population higher than 15,000 the voters express a direct choice for the mayor or an indirect choice voting for the party of the candidate's coalition. If no candidate receives at least 50% of votes, the top two candidates go to a second round after two weeks. The election of the City Council is based on a direct choice for the candidate with a preference vote: the candidate with the majority of the preferences is elected. The number of the seats for each party is determined proportionally.

Kingdom of Italy (1861–1946)
In 1865, the Kingdom of Italy created the office of Mayor of Livorno (Sindaco di Livorno), appointed by the King himself. From 1890 to 1926 the Mayor was elected by the City council. In 1926, the Fascist dictatorship abolished mayors and City councils, replacing them with an authoritarian Podestà chosen by the National Fascist Party. The office of Mayor was restored in 1944 during the Allied occupation.

Timeline

Italian Republic (since 1946)

City Council election (1946–1995)
From 1946 to 1995, the Mayor of Livorno was elected by the City's Council.

Direct election (since 1995)
Since 1995, under provisions of new local administration law, the Mayor of Livorno is chosen by direct election.

Timeline

See also
 Timeline of Livorno

References

Bibliography

External links
 

Livorno
 
Politics of Tuscany
Livorno